Edna Cintron (14 October, 1954 – September 11, 2001) was an American businesswoman in the financial industry and victim of the September 11 attacks on the World Trade Center. She served as a billing administrative assistant at Marsh McLennan.

Cintron is known for allegedly being the "waving woman" seen in the North Tower's impact zone.

Personal life
Cintron was born in Puerto Rico on October 14, 1954. She was brought to New York City by her mother when she was about five years old. Her family lived on Delancey Street, lower Manhattan. Cintron and met her husband William in 1987, and they lived in East Elmhurst, Queens, New York.

Career 
Cintron first worked at Manhattan's southern tip, first in the World Financial Centre, and in 1999 took a job in the World Trade Centre with the computer support section of Marsh, a large insurance broker, where she was the billing administrator's assistant.

September 11 attacks 

Cintron was an administrative assistant of claims for Marsh McLennan. At the time of the attacks, Cintron was located on the 97th floor of the North Tower.

Aftermath and legacy
Cintron's remains were found in the rubble. At the National 9/11 Memorial, she is memorialized at the North Pool at Panel N-12.

Cintron became known as The Waving Woman of 9/11 due to the widespread use of video footage of her last minutes, which were also used by 9/11 conspiracy theorists.

See also
 September 11 attacks
 Kevin Cosgrove
 Melissa Doi
 Frank De Martini
 Impending Death
 The Falling Man

References

1954 births
2001 deaths
Victims of the September 11 attacks
Businesspeople from New York (state)
Businesspeople in insurance
American_people_of_Puerto_Rican_descent
People murdered in New York City
Female murder victims
Terrorism deaths in New York (state)
American terrorism victims
20th-century American businesspeople